Cesano Boscone is a railway station in Italy. Located on the Mortara–Milan railway, it serves the town of Cesano Boscone.

Services
Cesano Boscone is served by line S9 of the Milan suburban railway network, operated by the Lombard railway company Trenord.

See also
 Milan suburban railway network

References

External links

Railway stations in Lombardy
Milan S Lines stations
Railway stations opened in 2009